The Reverend Donald Dungan Dod (October 10, 1912, Kansas City, Missouri – April 1, 2008, West Virginia), was an American missionary and orchidologist.

Life 

He went to Long Beach Junior College and graduated from  the University of California, Berkeley with a major in Chemistry. After a stint in the oil industry he entered San Francisco Theological Seminary in San Anselmo, CA, where he met his future wife, Annabelle Jean Stockton (aka Tudy). They graduated with a master's degree in Divinity and a Master in Christian Education respectively.

In 1946 the Dods established a Presbyterian ministry in El Guacio in  western Puerto Rico, which included among many other activities, a health clinic, a social work program and public health efforts. During their 17-year stay in Puerto Rico, they “became enamored of the flora and fauna of Puerto Rico”. While Tudy became interested in birds, Donald became an extremely well versed amateur orchidologist, having discovered well over fifty new orchid species and (having taught himself the rudiments of botanical Latin) described many of them himself.

They moved to the Dominican Republic in 1964 and remained there until his retirement in 1988. Continuing his varied activities as minister and social worker, Donald Dod became instrumental, among other causes, in the establishment of the Santo Domingo Botanical Gardens and the Museum of Natural History there, and in the creation of natural reserves on the island.

Donald Dod was a research associate at the Department of Botany, of the University of California, Berkeley.

Honors 

The Dods were made Caballeros de Colón, the highest civilian award of the Dominican Republic.

Named after him is the Parque Nacional Donald Dod, as well as the orchids
 Epidendrum dodii L.Sánchez & Hágsater 
 Lepanthopsis dodii Garay  
 Psychilis dodii Sauleda  
 Schiedeella dodii Burns-Bal. 
 Specklinia dodii (Garay) Luer 
 Lepanthes dodiana W.R.Stimson 
 Trigonochilum dodianum (Ackerman & Chiron) Königer

and named after Annabelle Dod
 Epidendrum annabellae Nir  
 Lepanthes tudiana Dod
 Psychilis × tudiana Dod

Publications

by D. Dod 
 DOD, D.D. 1976 Orquideas Dominicanas nuevas 1. Moscosoa 1:50–54.
 DOD, D.D. 1971 Orquideas Dominicanas nuevas.  Moscosoa   1:39–54.
 DOD, D.D. 1978 Orquideas dominicanas nuevas 3. Moscosoa 1:49–63.
 DOD, D.D.  1983  Orquideas (Orchidaceae) Dominicanas nuevas para la Espaniola y otras notas 4. Moscosoa 2:2–18.
 DOD, D.D. 1984  Quisqueya: a new and endemic genus from the island of Hispaniola 1. Bol. Soc. Dominicana de Orquideologia. 2:40–52.
 DOD, D.D. 1984 Orquideas (Orchidaceae) Dominicanas nuevas para la Espaniolla y otras notas 5. Moscosoa 3:100–120.
 DOD, D.D. 1984 Quisqueya: a new and endemic genus from the island of Hispaniola 2. Bol. Soc. Dominicana de Orquideologia. 3:16–30.
 DOD, D.D. 1986 Orquideas (Orchidaceae) Dominicanas nuevas à la ciencia, endemicas en la Hispaniola. Moscosoa 4:133–187.
 DOD, D.D. 1993 Orquideas (Orchidaceae) Dominicanas nuevas para la Espaniola y otras notas 8. Moscosoa 7:153–155.
 DOD, D.D. 1993 Orquideas (Orchidaceae) nuevas para la ciencia, endemicas de la Espaniola. 3. Moscosoa 7:157–165.
 DOD, D.D. 1993 El genero Epidendrum (Orchidaceae) de la Espaniola: Introduccion y clave. 3. Moscosoa 7:167–170.
 HESPENHEIDE, H.A. & D.D. DOD 1990 El genero Lepanthes  (Orchidaceae) de la Española 2. Moscosoa 6:167–195

by A. S. Dod 
 Annabelle S Dod  Endangered and endemic birds of the Dominican Republic. Cypress House, Fort Bragg, CA.1992.:
 Annabelle S Dod Guía de campo para las aves de la República Dominicana Museo Nacional de Historia Natural, 2002. Santo Domingo, R. D.
 Annabelle S Dod; José Osorio; Laura Rathe de Cambiaso Aves de la República Dominicana. Museo Nacional de Historia Natural, 1978. Santo Domingo, R. D.

References 
 Obituary

American Presbyterian missionaries
Orchidologists
1912 births
2008 deaths
Botanists active in the Caribbean
Presbyterian missionaries in Puerto Rico
Presbyterian missionaries in the Dominican Republic
Long Beach City College alumni
University of California, Berkeley alumni
Writers from Kansas City, Missouri
Scientists from California
20th-century American botanists
Missionary botanists